Huang Zhe (born 8 October 1990) is a Chinese rower. He competed in the men's lightweight coxless four event at the 2012 Summer Olympics.

References

1990 births
Living people
Chinese male rowers
Olympic rowers of China
Rowers at the 2012 Summer Olympics
People from Huangshi
Rowers from Hubei